Sandra Lawson (born 1970) is a rabbi and the first Director of Racial Diversity, Equity and Inclusion at Reconstructing Judaism. She previously served as Associate Chaplain for Jewish Life at Elon University. Lawson became the first openly gay, female, and black rabbi in the world in 2018. She is a veteran, vegan, sociologist, personal trainer, food activist, weightlifter, author and musician.

Biography
Lawson was born in St. Louis, Missouri, and grew up in a military, non-practicing Christian family.  Lawson graduated magna cum laude from Saint Leo University in Florida with a degree in sociology. She also holds a master's degree in sociology from Clark Atlanta University in Georgia.

As a college student, Lawson came out as a lesbian and enlisted in the U.S. Army. In the army she served in military law enforcement working on child abuse and domestic violence cases.

After graduating from college and leaving the military, she opened a personal training business. Through her client Rabbi Joshua Lesser, she came to discover Judaism and fell in love with Lesser's synagogue. She ultimately converted to Judaism in 2004.

Lawson went on to serve as an investigative researcher for the Anti-Defamation League and later began rabbinical school at the Reconstructionist Rabbinical College. She chose this path after attending an LGBT memorial for Coretta Scott King where she represented the Jewish community. She was the first African-American, and the first openly gay African-American accepted into the Reconstructionist Rabbinical College, which occurred in 2011. She was ordained as a rabbi in 2018 and was hired by Elon University that year. She served as Associate Chaplain for Jewish Life at Elon until she began a new position as the first Director of Racial Diversity, Equity and Inclusion at Reconstructing Judaism in 2021.

Lawson has been noted for her efforts to teach Judaism in unique locations. As a rabbinical student, Lawson ran a Friday night service at Arnold’s Way, a vegan cafe and health store near Philadelphia. She also has been noted for her efforts to teach by using social media and live video feeds. Lawson has been described as "Snapchat’s Top Rabbi" and the Best TikTok Rabbi.

In 2019 the JTA named Lawson one on "The 50 Jews everyone should follow on Twitter" and in 2020 Lawson was named one of "The Forward 50 in 2020: The people we (mostly) needed in the year we (definitely) didn’t". The Center for American Progress (CAP) named Lawson one of 22 Faith Leaders to watch in 2022.

Geoffrey Claussen describes Lawson as contributing to musar literature, citing her writing about curiosity.

References

External links
 
 Elon University Profile
 Rabbi Sandra Lawson on Youtube

1970 births
Living people
African-American female military personnel
African-American Jews
African-American religious leaders
African-American women writers
American LGBT military personnel
American Reconstructionist rabbis
American women in business
Clark Atlanta University alumni
Converts to Judaism
Elon University faculty
Female United States Army personnel
Jewish chaplains
American lesbian musicians
Jewish American musicians
American lesbian writers
LGBT African Americans
American LGBT businesspeople
LGBT rabbis
LGBT people from Missouri
Rabbis from Missouri
University and college chaplains in America
Saint Leo University alumni
Reconstructionist women rabbis
American women academics
21st-century American rabbis
20th-century American LGBT people
21st-century American LGBT people
21st-century African-American people
21st-century African-American women
20th-century African-American people
20th-century African-American women
African-American United States Army personnel